Henry Allison (1828–1881) was an Australian cricketer.
  
Henry Allison may also refer to:
Henry E. Allison, professor of philosophy
Hank Allison (Henry Henderson Allison, born 1947), former American football offensive tackle
Cliff Allison (Henry Clifford Allison, 1932–2005), racing driver

See also
William Henry Allison (1838–1934), Canadian politician and school lands commissioner